Spruce is a ghost town in Pocahontas County, West Virginia, United States.

History
Spruce was settled in 1902 along Shavers Fork of Cheat River. The principal industry in the area was logging, and later coal mining. In 1904 the West Virginia Pulp and Paper Company (later known as Westvaco) built a pulp mill nearby. The new community adjacent to the mill was also named Spruce, and the original settlement was renamed "Old Spruce." The Greenbrier and Elk Railroad served the town.

The pulp mill in Spruce closed in 1925, and the equipment was moved to the company's paper mill in Luke, Maryland. Subsequently, the town declined and it eventually was abandoned.

References

Unincorporated communities in Pocahontas County, West Virginia
Unincorporated communities in West Virginia
Populated places established in 1902
1902 establishments in West Virginia
Ghost towns in West Virginia